A number of vessels of the Royal Danish Navy have borne the name Iver Huitfeldt, after Iver Huitfeldt.

 , an ironclad in service 1887–1919.

References 

Royal Danish Navy ship names